Charles Anderson-Pelham, 3rd Earl of Yarborough (14 January 1835 – 6 February 1875), known as Lord Worsley from 1846 to 1852, was a British peer.

Yarborough was the son of Charles Anderson-Pelham, 2nd Earl of Yarborough, and his wife Maria Adelaide (née Maude). He was elected to the House of Commons for Great Grimsby in 1857, a seat he held until 1862, when he succeeded his father in the earldom.

Lord Yarborough married Lady Victoria Alexandrina, daughter of William Hare, 2nd Earl of Listowel, in 1858. He died in February 1875, aged only 40, and was succeeded in his titles by his fifteen-year-old son Charles. Lady Yarborough later married John Maunsell Richardson. Their southern English estate was The Cedars in Sunninghill in Berkshire.

Notes

References
Kidd, Charles, Williamson, David (editors). Debrett's Peerage and Baronetage (1990 edition). New York: St Martin's Press, 1990,

External links 
 

Yarborough, Charles Anderson-Pelham, 3rd Earl of
Yarborough, Charles Anderson-Pelham, 3rd Earl of
3
Liberal Party (UK) MPs for English constituencies
UK MPs 1857–1859
UK MPs 1859–1865
UK MPs who inherited peerages
People from Sunninghill
Members of the Parliament of the United Kingdom for Great Grimsby